Erwin Fiedor (20 May 1943 – 14 February 2012) was a Polish ski jumper and Nordic combined skier. He competed at the 1964 and 1968 Winter Olympics.

References

External links
 

1943 births
2012 deaths
Polish male ski jumpers
Polish male Nordic combined skiers
Olympic ski jumpers of Poland
Olympic Nordic combined skiers of Poland
Nordic combined skiers at the 1964 Winter Olympics
Nordic combined skiers at the 1968 Winter Olympics
Ski jumpers at the 1968 Winter Olympics
People from Cieszyn Silesia
People from Cieszyn County
Sportspeople from Silesian Voivodeship